Khada Bulak is a former air base in Chita Oblast, Russia located 9 km northeast of Sherlovaya Gora. Almost no trace remains of the former airfield.  It also is located near Bezrechnaya-2, which is sometimes referred to as Khada Bulak.

References
RussianAirFields.com

Soviet Air Force bases
Soviet Frontal Aviation